Balan Pandit (16 June 1926 – 5 June 2013) was an Indian cricketer. He played first-class cricket for Kathiawar, Kerala and Travancore-Cochin between 1946 and 1970.

His score of 262 not out against Andhra in 1959-60 remained a record for Kerala until the 2007-08 season.

Pandit served on India's junior selection committee and was the chairman of Kerala's selection committee. He also served as vice-president of Kerala Cricket Association.

References

External links
 

1926 births
2013 deaths
Indian cricketers
Saurashtra cricketers
Kerala cricketers
Travancore-Cochin cricketers
Cricketers from Kochi